Dimitrios Konstantinidis (born 2 June 1994) is a Greek professional footballer who plays as a right back for Super League club Levadiakos.

Club career

PAOK
Born in Korinos, Pieria, Konstantinidis started his career at the age of 14 in the youth ranks of PAOK after being spotted by the club's grassroots staff. He made his unofficial debut with the first team just having turned 16 years, against Partizan Belgrade in a 2010 friendly game. Initially, Konstantinidis played as a right midfielder, but in the academies turned to be a fully right-back player.

On 26 August 2012, Konstantinidis made his league debut in a 1–0 home win against Panthrakikos. At the end of the season, he signed a five-year contract with the club. In the third UEFA Europa League qualifying round, he scored his first goal for his club, equalizing the score to send the club to the UEFA Europa League playoffs. In the 2012–13 season he made 18 appearances. In January 2014, he was given on loan to Aiginiakos before returning to PAOK after six months.

On 6 August 2015, Konstantinidis scored his first goal with the club in all competitions in a 1–1 away draw for UEFA Europa League third preliminary round against Spartak Trnava. On 10 December 2015, he assisted Róbert Mak in a 0–1 defeat against Borussia Dortmund in the UEFA Europa League group stage, earning him a selection to the best UEFA Europa League squad of the week. On 20 December 2015, Konstantinidis suffered a cruciate ligament injury during Super League home game against Platanias keeping him out for the remainder of the season.
He returned to PAOK for the 2017–18 season, without making a single appearance with the club in the first half of the season.

Loan to Omonia
On 8 August 2016, Konstantinidis joined Cypriot club Omonia Nicosia on a 12-month loan deal from PAOK. He made 20 appearances with the club. On 26 May 2017, the club announced that with the end of the season the player would leave.

Brescia
In January 2018, Konstantinidis joined Serie B club Brescia rejecting a loan offer from financially struggling Panathinaikos. He joined manager Roberto Boscaglia's team as a free-agent, with the administration of the Greek Cup winners still keeping 30% of his rights in a future sale.

Aris
On 19 July 2018 he returned to the Superleague, signing a two-year contract with Aris. On 9 December 2018, he scored in a 4–2 away loss against Atromitos. On 31 December 2019, he mutually solved his contract with the club.

Zemplín Michalovce
On 4 February 2020, he signed to the Fortuna Liga club Zemplín Michalovce, for an undisclosed fee until the end of the year. He became another Greek to play for the eastern-Slovak club, joining Georgios Neofytidis, Kyriakos Savvidis, Christos Kountouriotis and Dimitris Popovits. Playing as a right-back, he made his debut in the Fortuna Liga away fixture against AS Trenčín on 15 February 2020. His debut turned out disastrous as Zemplín Michalovce were destroyed with a 1–8 defeat. Konstantinidis also competed in three other games those had preceded the suspension of Fortuna Liga caused by the COVID-19 pandemic.

Olympiakos Nicosia
He signed for Olympiakos Nicosia in January 2021.

International career
He was a member of all Greek national teams. At the age of 18, he was a starter for the Greece U20 team that participated in the 2013 FIFA U-20 World Cup held in Turkey.

Honours
Levadiakos
Super League 2: 2021–22

References

External links

OnSports

1994 births
Living people
Association football fullbacks
Greek footballers
Greek expatriate footballers
Greece youth international footballers
Greece under-21 international footballers
PAOK FC players
Aiginiakos F.C. players
AC Omonia players
Olympiakos Nicosia players
Brescia Calcio players
Aris Thessaloniki F.C. players
MFK Zemplín Michalovce players
FC Petržalka players
Ionikos F.C. players
Slovak Super Liga players
Super League Greece 2 players
2. Liga (Slovakia) players
Football League (Greece) players
Serie B players
Super League Greece players
Cypriot First Division players
Expatriate footballers in Slovakia
Expatriate footballers in Cyprus
Expatriate footballers in Italy
Greek expatriate sportspeople in Slovakia
Greek expatriate sportspeople in Cyprus
Greek expatriate sportspeople in Italy
Levadiakos F.C. players
FC Spartak Trnava players
People from Pieria (regional unit)
Footballers from Central Macedonia